Mason Cooley (1927 – July 25, 2002) was an American aphorist known for his witty aphorisms. One of these such aphorisms Cooley developed was "The time I kill is killing me."

He was professor emeritus of French, speech and world literature at the College of Staten Island. He was also an assistant professor of English at Columbia University from 1959 to 1967 and an adjunct professor from 1980 to 1988.

He received his B.A. from San Diego State University and his Ph.D. from Oxford. 

1927 births
2002 deaths
San Diego State University alumni
Columbia University faculty
Aphorists
College of Staten Island faculty
Alumni of the University of Oxford
American expatriates in England